Sidney Lawson Smith (August 3, 1912 – February 14, 2006) was an American football coach.  Smith was the head football coach at McPherson College in McPherson, Kansas for 16 seasons, from 1953 to 1966 and again from 1971 to 1972, compiling a record of 62–82–1.

Head coaching record

See also
 List of college football head coaches with non-consecutive tenure

References

External links
 

1912 births
2006 deaths
McPherson Bulldogs football coaches
People from Delta, Colorado